René Cagnat (10 October 1852 – 27 March 1937) was a French historian, a specialist of Latin epigraphy and history of North Africa during Antiquity.

Biography 
On the death of his father, Léon Renier, a friend of the family, supported his education. Under the influence of Ernest Desjardins, he became interested in epigraphy. Agrégé de grammaire in 1876, he led an archaeological campaign in Tunisia and became professor of epigraphy in 1883.

From 1880, René Cagnat devoted his first scientific work in 1882 on municipal militias as well as indirect taxes in the Roman Empire. In 1885 he published his famous Cours d'épigraphie latine which had several editions. His most lasting achievement was the creation in 1888 of the journal L'Année épigraphique, in which epigraphy reports, previously widely dispersed, were collected and published. In carrying out this task, he was assisted by Jean-Guillaume Feignon, his deputy epigrapher. By the 1880s, Cagnat focused especially on the inscriptions in North Africa. At the request of Theodor Mommsen, he studied, first with Johannes Schmidt then with Hermann Dessau, these inscriptions for the Corpus Inscriptionum Latinarum.

In the 1890s, the French government entrusted him with the monitoring of North African museums and local epigraphic research. Between 1906 and 1927, Cagnat contributed to the publication of Inscriptiones Graecae ad res Romanas pertinentes (collection of Greek inscriptions on topics related to the Roman Empire).

He married Geneviève Hauvette (1857–1935), the daughter of Eugène-Louis Hauvette-Besnault.

He was the stepfather of Alfred Merlin who succeeded him at the Academie des Inscriptions et Belles Lettres.

Honours 
In 1887, Cagnat was appointed a professor at the Collège de France, where he succeeded Desjardins at the chair of Roman epigraphy and antiquities. In 1895, he was elected a member of the Académie des Inscriptions et Belles-Lettres, of which he was permanent secretary from 1916 to his death. In 1904, on the recommendation of Otto Hirschfeld and Ulrich von Wilamowitz-Moellendorff, he was elected a corresponding member of the Prussian Academy of Sciences.
Elected member of the Royal Academy of Science, Letters and Fine Arts of Belgium.

Publications (selection) 
1882: Etude historique sur les impots indirects chez les Romains jusqu'aux invasions des barberes, Paris, Imprimerie nationale
1885: Cours d'épigraphie latine, Paris, reprint 1890 (read the 1890 edition online)
1892: L'armée romaine d'Afrique et l'occupation militaire de l'Afrique sous les empereurs, Paris
1895–1905 Timgad, une cité africaine sous l'Empire romain with Émile Boeswillwald and Albert Ballu, éd. Ernest Leroux, Paris, (read online)
1909: Carthage, Timgad, Tébessa et les villes antiques de l'Afrique du Nord, Paris, reprint 1927
1916–1920: Manuel d'archéologie romaine with Victor Chapot, Paris
1923: Inscriptions latines d'Afrique, Paris

Bibliography 
 Christa Kirsten [sous la dir. de], Die Altertumswissenschaften an der Berliner Akademie. Wahlvorschläge zur Aufnahme von Mitgliedern von F.A. Wolf bis zu G. Rodenwaldt, éd. Akademie-Verlag, Berlin, 1985 (vol. 5 des études sur l'histoire de l'German Academy of Sciences at Berlin), pp. 128–129

References

External links 
 René Cagnat on data.bnf.fr
 Conférences faites au musée Guimet on Gallica

19th-century French historians
20th-century French historians
French epigraphers
French scholars of Roman history
Academic staff of the Collège de France
Members of the Académie des Inscriptions et Belles-Lettres
Members of the Prussian Academy of Sciences
Members of the Royal Academy of Belgium
École Normale Supérieure alumni
1852 births
1937 deaths